Uruguay elects on national level a head of state – the president – and a legislature.

Uruguay has a stable multi-party system. The two "traditional parties" (Colorado Party and National Party) were founded in 1836, and were predominant for over a century. The Broad Front coalition was created in 1971, including members such as the Socialist Party (founded in 1910) and the Communist Party (founded in 1920).

Presidential elections 
The president and the vice-president are elected on one ballot for a five-year term by the people.

Each party must elect its candidates for President and Vice-President in primary elections, which are usually held in June. The selected candidates face the electorate in the general elections in October. If no candidate obtains the absolute majority of votes, there is a runoff between the two most-voted candidates.

Parliamentary elections 
The General Assembly (Asamblea General) has two chambers. The Chamber of Deputies (Cámara de Diputados) has 99 members, elected for a five-year term by proportional representation with representation from the 19 departments. The Chamber of Senators (Cámara de Senadores) has 30 members elected for a five-year term by proportional representation at the national level, plus the Vice-president.

After the 2019 elections, seven parties are represented in the Chamber of Deputies and four in the Chamber of Senators.

Schedule

Election

Inauguration

Latest elections

2019 general election
On 25 November, preliminary results in the runoff election showed Lacalle Pou with a majority (48.71%) by 28,666 votes over Martínez (47.51%), which delayed the announcement of a winner as 35,229 absentee votes needed to be counted. Martínez later conceded defeat on 28 November. On 30 November, final votes counts confirmed Lacalle Pou as the winner with 48.8% of the total votes cast over Martínez with 47.3%.

Past elections and referendums

Local elections
2000 Uruguayan municipal elections
2005 Uruguayan municipal elections
2010 Uruguayan municipal elections
2015 Uruguayan municipal elections

Next elections 
2022 Uruguayan Law of Urgent Consideration referendum 
2024 Uruguayan general election
2025 Uruguayan municipal elections

See also
 Electoral calendar
 Electoral system
 Ley de lemas

References

External links
Adam Carr's Election Archive
Political Data Bank at the Social Sciences School - Universidad de la República (Uruguay)